Patrik Vass (born 17 January 1993) is a Hungarian football player who plays for Nyíregyháza.

Club statistics

Updated to games played as of 7 February 2022.

External links
Profile at HLSZ 
Profile at MLSZ 

1993 births
Living people
Footballers from Budapest
Hungarian footballers
Association football midfielders
MTK Budapest FC players
Vasas SC players
Gyirmót FC Győr players
Zalaegerszegi TE players
Nyíregyháza Spartacus FC players
Nemzeti Bajnokság I players
Nemzeti Bajnokság II players